Michelle Finn may refer to:

 Michelle Finn-Burrell (born 1965), American sprinter
 Michelle Finn (steeplechaser) (born 1989), Irish  middle-distance runner